Ross Bjork (born October 22, 1972) is the current athletics director for Texas A&M University. He previously served as the director of athletics for University of Mississippi and Western Kentucky University, where he was the youngest athletic director among all 120 NCAA FBS schools when hired. He has also previously worked for the University of Miami, UCLA, and the University of Missouri.

Bjork received his bachelor's degree from Emporia State University in 1995 and his master's degree from Western Illinois University in 1996. Bjork is married to Sonya and has two sons Payton and Paxton.

References

1972 births
Living people
Emporia State Hornets football players
Ole Miss Rebels athletic directors
Texas A&M Aggies athletic directors
Western Kentucky Hilltoppers and Lady Toppers athletic directors
Western Illinois University alumni